Horbury Academy (formerly Horbury School) is a  mixed secondary school located in Horbury in the City of Wakefield, West Yorkshire, England.

The school previously held specialist status as a Language College, and a new building was completed in 2009 on the same site as the old one. In September 2012 Horbury School Converted to academy status and was renamed Horbury Academy. The school offers GCSEs and BTECs as programmes of study for pupils.

Notable former pupils
Lee Beachill, squash player
James Bree, footballer
Ryan, Gary and Ross Jarman, founding members of The Cribs

References

External links
Horbury Academy official website

Secondary schools in the City of Wakefield
Academies in the City of Wakefield